Automobiles Chatenet is a manufacturer of microcars based in the Haute-Vienne department of France.  The company was founded in 1984 by Louis-Georges Chatenet.

Models

 Stella
 Media
 Barooder
 Speedino
 CH26 v1
 CH26 v2
 CH32 Pick-Up
 CH28
 CH39 Sporteevo
 CH30
 CH32
 CH40
 CH46

References

External links
 Automobiles Chatenet Official Site.

Town
Quadricycles
Car manufacturers of France
Electric vehicle manufacturers of France
French brands
Vehicle manufacturing companies established in 1984
1984 establishments in France